Intercity Football League was the top-ranked division in the Taiwanese football (soccer) league run by Chinese Taipei Football Association (CTFA), run from 2007 until 2016. From 2017, it was replaced by the Taiwan Football Premier League.

History
The Intercity Football League was founded in 2007 after the transformation of then highest-ranked National First Division Football League (later Enterprise Football League). Different from the later, registered players were initially grouped by their places of residence, such as Tainan City, rather than specialized football teams, such as Taiwan Power Company (Taipower). The only exception was Tatung FC, who represented Taipei City to compete in the league. By Intercity Football League's establishment, CTFA hoped to root football into each area in Taiwan and also seed supports from local governments, councilors, and enterprises. In the first league season, several magistrates served as team leaders, including Chou Hsi-wei (Taipei County), Chen Ming-wen (Chiayi County), and Lu Kuo-hua (Yilan County).

Nevertheless, in 2008, CTFA opened the league participation to non-administrative division teams. Taipower and several college teams, such as National Taiwan College of Physical Education (as Taichung County Chia Cheng Hsin) and Taipei Physical Education College (as Tainan County Hun Shin), joined the competition.

CTFA announced new league regulations again in 2009. Each participating team should have name relating to one administrative region and more than 2/3 players having their households registered to that place for more than one month. Promotion and relegation were also introduced. However, the new regulations did not continue to the next league season. The 2010 league season adopted similar regulations as the 2008 season.

In August 2010, MediaTek were announced as the title sponsor of the Intercity Football League until 2013.

Champions
The list of champions:

See also
Enterprise Football League
Chinese Taipei Football Association

References

External links
CTFA news
League at fifa.com
League at soccerway.com

 
1
Sports leagues established in 2007
2007 establishments in Taiwan
Taiwan